Crucolo is an artisanal cow's milk cheese made by a single producer at the Rifugio Crucolo, situated at the mouth of the Val Campelle in Trentino, northern Italy.

The cheeses, which are matured for at least two months are cylindrical in form and typically weigh . They are ivory tan in color with irregular holes throughout, is available in three varieties.

References

External links
Cheese Library - Crucolo

Italian cheeses
Cow's-milk cheeses